"Take Her Place" is a single by Dutch DJ Don Diablo featuring American band Arizona. It was released on 27 October 2017  from his second studio album Future.

Music video
The music video was uploaded on 23 November 2017, In the music video, Diablo's pet husky accompanies him throughout his daily routine–which in this case, includes a midnight drive in a vintage DeLorean–with an emotional twist. The aesthetic of the video pays homage to the 80s, with an almost vaporwave presentation.

Charts

Weekly charts

Year-end charts

References

2017 singles
2017 songs
Don Diablo songs
Songs written by Don Diablo
Songs written by Scott Harris (songwriter)